Gonçalo Ribeiro (born 22 February 1997) is a Portuguese handball player who plays for EHV Aue.

References

1997 births
Living people
Portuguese male handball players
Sportspeople from Lisbon